Trigastrotheca may refer to:
 Trigastrotheca (wasp), a genus of insects in the family Braconidae
 Trigastrotheca (plant), a genus of flowering plants in the family Molluginaceae